Altai State University is a coeducational and public research university in Barnaul, Russia. It was established by a decree by Leonid Brezhnev as the first multidisciplinary university in Altai Krai in 1973.

Altai State University has the following departments: Arts, Biology, Chemistry, Geography, History, Law, 
Mathematics and IT, Mass Communication, Philology and Political Science,
Physics and Technology, Education and Psychology, Sociology and
International Institute of Economics, Management and Informational Systems.

The university has affiliates in Biysk, Belokurikha, Rubtsovsk and Slavgorod all in Altai Krai.

References

External links
Altai State University website

Universities and institutes established in the Soviet Union
Universities in Altai Krai
Educational institutions established in 1973
Education in Barnaul
1973 establishments in the Soviet Union